Efi Ma'afu (born 23 January 1998) is an Australian rugby union player who plays for the Queensland Reds in Super Rugby. His playing position is hooker. He has signed for the Reds squad in 2019.

Super Rugby statistics

Reference list

External links
Rugby.com.au profile
itsrugby.co.uk profile

1998 births
Australian rugby union players
Living people
Rugby union hookers
Queensland Reds players
Queensland Country (NRC team) players
Australian expatriate rugby union players
Expatriate rugby union players in Japan
Sunwolves players
Melbourne Rebels players
Yokohama Canon Eagles players
Rouen Normandie Rugby players
Expatriate rugby union players in France